The South India Reformed Churches is a conservative Calvinist denomination in south India. This denomination is located in Andhra Pradesh and is a Calvinist church mission of the United States. It has 8 congregations with many children's homes.

The denomination was formed in 1993 by a former Baptist pastor, Rev Abraham wo become more and more convinced of the Calvinist faith, including paedobaptism. Meanwhile, 3 small congregations were established in Bagalur, Salem and Bangalore. It places high priority of evangelization among Hindu people. The Presbyterian Theological Seminary in India provides the theological training. Sister church relations with the Reformed Churches in the Netherlands (Liberated) was established. 

In Tamil Nadu state of India there are 3 congregations. In 2011 6 independent congregations joined the small federation. In 2012, another 6 congregations and pastors joined the church. Most of the churches growing visible. In six cities, there are church planting projects.

It is a member of the World Reformed Fellowship.

References 

1993 establishments in India
Presbyterianism in India
Reformed denominations in Asia
Members of the World Reformed Fellowship